are an English post-punk band. They have been active in various forms since 1979, with the singer-songwriter Matt Johnson as the only constant band member.  achieved critical acclaim and commercial success in the UK, with 15 chart singles (seven reaching the top 40), and their most successful album, Infected (1986), spent 30 weeks on the chart. They followed this with the top-ten albums Mind Bomb (1989) and Dusk (1993).

History

Early years (1977–1981)
In November 1977, Matt Johnson placed an advertisement in NME seeking "bass/lead guitarist" who liked the Velvet Underground and Syd Barrett.  He placed a second advertisement in the NME, stating his new influences as The Residents and Throbbing Gristle.

While trying to get his band going, in 1978 Johnson had recorded a solo demo album (See Without Being Seen) which he sold at various underground gigs on cassettes. In 1979, working with Colin Lloyd-Tucker (a friend and colleague at De Wolfe Music, the Soho music publisher/recording studio) Johnson recorded his first album proper, Spirits. This album remains unreleased, although the track "What Stanley Saw" was later licensed to Cherry Red Records for their Perspectives and Distortion compilation album, which also featured Virgin Prunes, Lemon Kittens, Thomas Leer, Kevin Coyne and Mark Perry.

 made their debut at London's Africa Centre on 11 May 1979, third on the bill to Scritti Politti and PragVEC, using backing tape tracks that Johnson created at his day job at De Wolfe studios for the drums and bass. The band at this point consisted of Johnson on vocal, electric piano, guitar and tapes and Keith Laws on synthesiser and tapes. It was Keith Laws who suggested the name '' to Matt Johnson.

As  was now getting underway, Johnson was simultaneously working with experimental synth-pop combo the Gadgets, a studio group he formed with Colin Lloyd Tucker, his colleague at De Wolfe recording studios.

Peter Ashworth, then known as 'Triash' and later to become a noted photographer, became  drummer in 1980, and Tom Johnston (also managing  at this point and later to become a cartoonist for the Evening Standard, Daily Mirror and The Sun newspapers) was added on bass. Although both Ashworth and Johnston were credited with appearing on  debut single ("Controversial Subject"/"Black and White") on 4AD Records, neither actually played on the recordings, which were produced by Wire members Bruce Gilbert and Graham Lewis. All instruments were played by Johnson and Laws. As a duo (Johnson and Laws),  began performing concerts with Wire, Cabaret Voltaire, DAF, This Heat, the Birthday Party and Scritti Politti.

In early 1981  also contributed the composition 'Untitled' to the Some Bizzare Album. In September of that year Johnson and Laws signed a deal with Some Bizzare Records and released the 7" single "Cold Spell Ahead". By this stage Matt Johnson had begun playing all the instruments himself so Laws left to pursue his studies, leaving Johnson as a solo artist using a group moniker.

Johnson was signed up later in 1981 to 4AD Records by Ivo Watts-Russell to record a solo album, Burning Blue Soul. Although all of the instruments and vocals were performed by Johnson, the album featured various producers including Wire's Bruce Gilbert and Graham Lewis, Ivo and Johnson himself. Years later, owing to a request from Johnson, it would be re-issued and credited to  so all of his albums would be in the same rack together.

Towards the end of 1981, Colin Lloyd-Tucker and Simon Fisher-Turner joined the band for a series of stripped down  acoustic concerts in London.

Matt Johnson solo years (1982–1987)
Now freed from the politics of a permanent group line-up, Johnson was able to take  up to the next level, and spent the next few years collaborating with a diverse range of creative individuals, freely changing personnel from project to project.

 next single was a retooling of "Cold Spell Ahead", now entitled "Uncertain Smile". Produced in New York by Mike Thorne, it reached No. 68 UK. This version is different from the more familiar album version, and featured sax and flute by session player Crispin Cioe rather than (as on the album version) the piano of Squeeze's Jools Holland.

Johnson apparently ran off some cassette copies for friends, and several tracks ("Mental Healing Process", "Leap into The Wind", "Absolute Liberation") were subsequently issued as additional tracks on the "This Is the Day" single. "Three Orange Kisses from Kazan" and "Waitin' for the Upturn" (featuring Steve James Sherlock playing flute and saxophone) also date from this era, and appeared as B-sides. Some of the previously-mentioned cuts, along with the tracks "The Nature of Virtue" and "Fruit of the Heart" (which were similarly recorded around the same time), appeared as bonus selections on a cassette-only issue of the band's eventual debut album, but The Pornography of Despair album as a whole remains unissued.

Around 1982  played a series of four concerts at the Marquee Club in Wardour Street, Soho, entitled 'An evening of Rock n Roll with '. These concerts were weekly for four weeks and featured Marc Almond on guitar and vocals.

 released their official album debut, the synth-noir classic Soul Mining, in 1983. It featured the minor UK No. 71 hit "This Is the Day", as well as a new recording of  performing "Uncertain Smile". Produced by Johnson and Paul Hardiman, it featured guest appearances from Orange Juice's drummer Zeke Manyika, Jools Holland, Thomas Leer and J. G. Thirlwell (aka Foetus).

During  more prolific period of releases, from Soul Mining (1983) to Dusk (1992), most artwork used on the albums and single releases was produced by Johnson's brother Andrew Johnson, using the pseudonym Andy Dog. The artwork has a distinctive style, and sometimes courted controversy, most notably the initial release of the 1986 single "Infected", which featured a masturbating devil and was withdrawn from sale and re-issued with an edited version of the same drawing.

For the 1986 album Infected,  still consisted only of Johnson, but was augmented by session musicians and featured friends such as Manyika and Rip Rig + Panic singer Neneh Cherry and Anna Domino. This album spawned four charting singles in the UK, notably "Heartland", which made the UK top 30. It was also unusual for having a full-length accompanying film. Costing hundreds of thousands of pounds, Infected: The Movie was shot on locations in Bolivia, Peru and New York. Different songs were directed by different directors, mainly Tim Pope and Peter 'Sleazy' Christopherson (of Throbbing Gristle).

Throughout 1986-1987 Johnson toured the world extensively with Infected: The Movie, showing the film in cinemas in place of performing live concerts. The film was also shown twice in its entirety on Channel 4 in the UK and on MTV's 120 Minutes in the US.

In 1987 Johnson also took some tentative steps back into live performance. Whilst promoting Infected: The Movie in Australia he had a chance encounter with Billy Bragg, who persuaded him to return to Britain and support Red Wedge, a coalition of like-minded musicians supporting the British Labour Party in its election campaign. Johnson agreed and enrolled longtime friend and collaborator Manyika to join him in performing shows in London featuring stripped-down versions of political  songs such as "Heartland". This experience convinced Johnson to put a band together once again.

Return to a full band (1988–2002)
By 1988,  was an actual band again, Johnson having recruited ex-Smiths guitarist Johnny Marr, ex-Nick Lowe bassist James Eller and ex-ABC drummer David Palmer as fully-fledged members. This line-up, plus guest singer Sinéad O'Connor, recorded the album Mind Bomb, which debuted at No. 4 in the UK Albums Chart and featured the band's highest charting single to that time, "The Beat(en) Generation", which peaked at No. 18 in the UK Singles Chart. The first single from Mind Bomb was actually scheduled to be "Armageddon Days Are Here (again) but with its chorus of "Islam is rising, the Christians mobilising" and sensitivities over the Salman Rushdie affair that had recently erupted, this song was deemed unsuitable for release by Epic/CBS.

Keyboardist D.C. Collard was added to the official line-up in 1989 (keyboard player Steve Hogarth, who'd played on Infected, had initially been asked to join but opted instead to become the new lead vocalist of Marillion). The band embarked on a lengthy world tour in 1989–90 called  Versus the World. The live film of the same name, directed by Tim Pope, was filmed during the three nights  performed at London's Royal Albert Hall at the end of the tour. Vocalist Melanie Redmond, who had just completed a world tour with Duran Duran, joined the tour during the European leg as a session musician.

The studio EP Shades of Blue was released in 1990. This included cover versions of Fred Neil's "Dolphins" and Duke Ellington's "Solitude" as well as a new original song "Jealous of Youth" and a live version of "Another Boy Drowning" from Burning Blue Soul. This and a later EP of remixes, 1993's Dis-infected, were compiled into a 1994 full-length album for the North American market called Solitude.

In 1993, with Johnson, Marr, Collard, Eller and Palmer, Some Bizzare Records/Epic issued the album Dusk, which debuted at No. 2 in the UK and spun off three top 40 singles in the UK, led by "Dogs of Lust". Another world tour followed, the Lonely Planet tour, at which point the band's line-up was reshuffled; Marr and Eller left, and were replaced by Atlanta-based guitarist Keith Joyner and New York bassist Jared Michael Nickerson after Johnson relocated the band to the U.S. Also added was Boston harmonica player Jim Fitting (formerly of Treat Her Right), who auditioned in New York in early 1993.  Palmer bowed out partway through the tour and was replaced by ex-Stabbing Westward drummer Andy Kubiszewski. The band headlined the main stage at the 1993 Reading Festival.

Another full-length film, directed by longtime collaborator Tim Pope, was made for this album. From Dusk Til Dawn was shot in New Orleans and New York, and along with Johnson and Johnny Marr also featured various characters from the New York underground scene such as sexologist Annie Sprinkle, writer and raconteur Quentin Crisp, Guardian Angels founder Curtis Sliwa, and porn star Rick Savage amongst many carnival characters.

Now permanently relocated to New York,  next project was 1995's Hanky Panky, an album that consisted entirely of Hank Williams cover tunes. Hanky Panky was recorded by a new group consisting of Johnson, Collard, Fitting, ex Iggy Pop guitarist Eric Schermerhorn, ex David Bowie bass guitarist Gail Ann Dorsey (billed as "Hollywood" Dorsey), and drummer the "Reverend" Brian MacLeod. Their cover version of "I Saw the Light" hit No. 31 UK.Released by Some Bizzare Label / Epic

An experimental album called Gun Sluts was recorded in 1997, but left unreleased by the band after it was rejected for being too uncommercial by their label.  severed their eighteen-year relationship with Sony and moved to Interscope, on Trent Reznor's Nothing Records imprint.

In 2000, now consisting of Johnson, Schermerhorn, Nashville bassist Spencer Campbell and New Jersey drummer Earl Harvin, released NakedSelf and embarked on yet another lengthy world tour, the Naked Tour, this one lasting 14 months. Not counting soundtrack albums, NakedSelf remains  final released studio album to date.

This same line-up also recorded two new tracks, "Deep Down Truth", featuring Angela McCluskey on vocals and "Pillar Box Red". Both songs were produced by Clive Langer and Alan Winstanley for the 2002 compilation album 45 RPM: The Singles of the The.

In June 2002  made a sole live appearance at the Meltdown Festival at London's Royal Festival Hall as guests of David Bowie. At this point, the band consisted solely of Johnson and longtime friend and collaborator J. G. Thirlwell aka Foetus on tapes and loops, and young film director  on film and video.

Hiatus (2003–2017)
Since 2003, the reclusive Johnson has kept well away from the public eye and has concentrated primarily on soundtrack work, scoring numerous documentaries, films and art installations.  music has featured in a diverse range of cinema over many years, from cult classics such as Jürgen Muschalek's (Muscha) Decoder ("Three Orange Kisses From Kazan") and Gregg Araki's Nowhere ("Love is Stronger Than Death") to big-budget epics such as Sylvester Stallone's Judge Dredd ("Darkness Falls"), prompting Johnson's move into film soundtrack composition.

For English director Nichola Bruce it has included the documentary One Man Show: Dramatic Art of Steven Berkoff (1995) and a documentary feature film about the Apollo moon landings, Moonbug, which was completed in autumn 2010 and won the Special Jury Remi Award for Theatrical Feature Documentary at the 2011 Houston International Film Festival. The soundtrack was released in 2012 as volume 2 in the series of original soundtrack albums produced through Johnson's Cineola imprint.

For Swedish filmmaker Johanna St Michaels this has included Best Wishes Bernhard (prize winning film of Dokumentär Films Premien Nordic Panorama 2003), Snapshots From Reality (Nominated for Best International Short at the Birds Eye View Film festival at London's ICA 2007) The Track (2007), Going Live (2008), The Island Amid the Worlds (2010) and Bilder av Dina (2010). The latest collaboration between Johnson and St Michaels, Penthouse North premiered at the Hot Docs Canadian International Documentary Festival in May 2014.

In June 2009 it was announced that  had created an original soundtrack to the Gerard Johnson debut feature film Tony, released February 2010 on  Cineola imprint in March 2010, as the first volume of several forthcoming soundtrack and instrumental albums.

In May 2014,  completed an original soundtrack for Gerard Johnson's subsequent film, Hyena. Starring Peter Ferdinando, Stephen Graham and Neil Maskell. The album was released on 6 March 2015 as the third part in the Cinéola series.

In May 2007  released a new download-only single on their web site. Entitled "Mrs. Mac", the track is an autobiographical song about Johnson's first day at school as a child in Stratford, East London. All instruments and vocals on the track were performed by Johnson.

A press release was issued along with this track, announcing a forthcoming  album called The End of the Day with various songs from  catalogue being performed by some of Johnson's favourite artists including Elysian Fields, J.G. Thirlwell, Thomas Leer, Elbow, Rob Ellis, John Parish, Anna Domino, Meja, Angela McCluskey, Ergo Phizmiz, "Rustin Man" aka Paul Webb among others. To date, the album remains a work in progress, although a preview can be heard at the band's official site.

Since 2009, "This Is the Day" has been extensively used in high-profile advertising campaigns for Levi's Dockers, M&M's and Amazon. It was used as the opening song for the movie I Feel Pretty (2018).

 music continued to appear on British radio and television such as in Shane Meadows 2010 Channel 4 series This Is England '86 and in 2013 in the award-winning British sit-com Fresh Meat. In 2011 "This Is the Day" was covered by British band Manic Street Preachers.

Matt Johnson has created several new arms of :
 Cinéola; a label specifically created for soundtrack and spoken word releases and which are released as CDs within small, hardback books, complete with photographs and text.
 Radio Cinéola; a 15-minute 'shortwave radio' broadcast downloadable from the official web site and featuring previews of upcoming releases, works in progress, chats with collaborators and, from the vault, previously unheard material. The broadcasts are presented by Johnson and other guests. Shows have so far included contributions from, and collaborations with, musicians DJ Food, Deadly Avenger, Hayley Willis, Thomas Feiner, Angela McCluskey, Colin Lloyd Tucker plus poet John Tottenham, photographer Steve Pyke, actress Marlene Kaminsky, spiritual healer Abdi Assadi and many others. Monthly downloadable Radio Cineola broadcasts ceased at the end of December 2010, although the broadcasts continue at randomly chosen dates.
 Fifty First State Press; a book publishing company whose name is inspired by the chorus of Johnson's 1986 song "Heartland". The first release, in 2012, was Tales From The Two Puddings, a memoir by Matt's dad, Eddie, which recounts the Johnson family's time owning one of East London's most notorious pubs and music houses, the Two Puddings in Stratford. It features many of the legendary customers of this famous pub, such as Jackie Charlton, the Kray Twins, Van Morrison, Bobby Moore, Clyde McPhatter, The Who, Daniel Farson, Terry Spinks and countless others. 

In the spring of 2014, it was announced by Sony Music Entertainment that they plan to release a Soul Mining 30th Anniversary Deluxe Edition Boxset in the summer of 2014. The reissue was remastered by Matt Johnson at Abbey Road Studios.

Authored by Neil Fraser, it will apparently have the full cooperation of Matt Johnson.

Johnson told Uncut magazine in early 2015 that he was starting to write the first new vocal-based  album since 2000's Nakedself. This has not yet materialised.

Reformation and new material (2017–present)
For 2017's Record Store Day, after premiering the song on a Radio Cineola broadcast,  released a new 7" record called "We Can't Stop What's Coming", collaborating once again with Johnny Marr. On 10 September, it was announced that Johnson would be touring as  again for the first time in 17 years. Two dates were announced, in Denmark on 1 June 2018 and at Royal Albert Hall on 5 June 2018. The Royal Albert Hall tickets sold out, with two extra performances added at O2's Brixton Academy and The Troxy, both in London. Several more shows around the UK and Europe were subsequently added, as well as eight shows in the US.  also played on 2 & 3 October 2018 in the Sydney Opera House.

The touring announcement came subsequent to  announcing a new triple-vinyl limited-edition box set, Radio Cineola: Trilogy, to be released when they kick off their first gigs since 2002. Featuring three albums – The End of the Day, The Inertia Variations, and Midnight to Midnight – the triple box set package, available for pre-order from 6 October 2017, also came with 48-page bound book which included album lyrics and exclusive photos. The End of the Day contains interpretations of a selection of  songs from singers across the globe and includes  recent single "We Can't Stop What's Coming". The Inertia Variations features Johnson narrating John Tottenham's epic poetic cycle. "Midnight To Midnight includes interviews and soundscapes taken from Johnson's 12-hour UK Election Day Radio Cineola shortwave broadcast plus the electronic score from The Inertia Variations documentary," said a spokesperson for the band, speaking to The Quietus.

In January 2021, the soundtrack to the 2019 film Muscle, directed by Gerard Johnson, was released. The first track on this EP was "I Want 2 B U", a new song that was released as a 7" single for Record Store Day 2020.

On 29 October 2021,  released The Comeback Special on Cinéola/earMUSIC, a live album recorded at the Royal Albert Hall gig in 2018. This album was released in a number of formats, including one release with an art book and a film of the performance.

Members

Current touring band members
On 18 May 2018, the band members for the live comeback were announced on the official  Facebook page.

 Matt Johnsonvocals, guitars
 Barrie Cadoganlead guitar
 DC Collardkeyboards, melodica
 James Ellerbass guitar
 Earl Harvindrums

Official members 
From 1983 to 1988, and again from 2002 to the present, he was the only official member.

Official band members have been:

 Matt Johnsonvocals, guitars, keyboards, bass, melodica, engineering.
 Keith Lawssynthesiser (1979–1981). (Now a Professor of Neuropsychology at the University of Hertfordshire.)
 Tom Johnstonbass guitar (1980). (Now a cartoonist for national newspapers.)
 Triash (a.k.a. Peter Ashworth)drums, percussion (1980)
 Colin Lloyd Tuckerguitars/vocals (1981)
 Simon Fisher Turnerguitars/vocals (1981)
 David Palmerdrums (1985–1994)
 Johnny Marrguitars and harmonica (1988–1994, 2017)
 James Ellerbass (1988–1994)
 D.C. Collardkeyboards (1989–1997)
 Jim Fittingharmonica (1993–1995)
 Keith Joynerguitar (1993–1994)
 Jared Michael Nickersonbass (1993–1994)
 Eric Schermerhornguitars (1995–2002)
 Brian MacLeoddrums (1995–1997)
 Gail Ann Dorsey (billed as 'Hollywood' Dorsey)bass (1995)
 Spencer Campbellbass and backing vocals (1998–2002)
 Earl Harvindrums (1998–2002)

Collaborators and contributors

 Marc Almond – vocals (1982)
 David Johansen – harmonica (1982)
 Fiona Skinnergraphic designer & film-maker:   logo & font, typography, cover designs & layouts, video/promo direction.
 J. G. Thirlwell – tapes, samples, percussion (1983–present)
 Andy Dog – paintings, illustrations, sleeves, (1981–1993)
 Tim Pope – filmmaker (1986–2021)
 Peter Christopherson – filmmaker (1986–1987)
 Jools Holland – piano (1983)
 Thomas Leer – keyboards (1983)
 Jean-Marc Lederman – live keyboards (1983)
 Zeke Manyika – drums
 Steve Hogarth – piano (1986)
 Neneh Cherry – vocals (1986)
 Anna Domino – vocals (1986)
 Andrew Poppy – arrangement (1986)
 Ashley Slater – trombone (1986)
 Sinéad O'Connor – vocals (1989)
 Melanie Redmond – vocals (1989–1990)
 Vinnie Colaiuta – drums (1993)
 Bruce Smith – drums (1993)
 Danny Thompson – upright bass (1988–1993)
 Lloyd Cole – vocals (1999)
 Benn Northover – filmmaker (2002)
 Ian Peel – producer, sound collage (2002)
 Steve James Sherlock – saxophone, flute (1979–81)
 Paul "Wix" Wickens – piano, Hammond organ, accordion (1983, 1989)
 Mark Feltham – harmonica on Mind Bomb (1989): "Kingdom of Rain" / "Good Morning Beautiful" / "The Beat(en) Generation" / "The Violence of Truth"
 Angela McCluskey – vocals on "Deep Down Truth" (2002)

Timeline

Discography

Commercially released albums
 Matt Johnson: Burning Blue Soul (1981)
 Original release and 1983 reissue credited to Matt Johnson.

Compilation albums
 Solitude (1993)
 45 RPM (2002)
 London Town Box Set (2002)

Exclusive  tracks appear on the following compilation albums of tracks by various artists:
 Some Bizzare Album (1981)
 Natures Mortes - Still Lives (1982)
 If You Can't Please Yourself, You Can't Please Your Soul (1985)
 Judge Dredd Original Motion Picture Soundtrack (1996)
 Mitra Music for Nepal (2015)
 90's Rarities – Volume 2 (2016)

Unreleased, limited edition and promo-only albums
The recording career of /Matt Johnson features numerous full-length albums that have never seen commercial release. Despite their unavailability on disc, Johnson includes these albums in almost every official discography issued by the band.

Singles

See also: Solitude (EP) which was released in December 1999 and contained remixes of  songs—most notably, "That Was the Day", a version of their single, "This Is the Day".

References

External links
 
 

1979 establishments in England
Art pop groups
British synth-pop new wave groups
English new wave musical groups
English post-punk music groups
English synth-pop groups
English alternative rock groups
Epic Records artists
4AD artists
Interscope Records artists
Musical groups established in 1979
Nothing Records artists
Progressive pop groups
Some Bizzare Records artists